The 2011 Porsche Tennis Grand Prix was a women's tennis tournament played on indoor clay courts. It was the 34th edition of the Porsche Tennis Grand Prix, and was part of the Premier tournaments of the 2011 WTA Tour. It took place at the Porsche Arena in Stuttgart, Germany, from 16 April through 24 April 2011. Seven of the top ten ranked women participated in the tournament. Unseeded Julia Görges won the singles title.

Prize money & points distribution

Points distribution

Prize money
The total commitment prize money for this year's event is $721,000.

Entrants

Seeds

 Rankings are as of 11 April  2011.

Other entrants
The following players received wildcards into the main draw:
  Kristina Barrois
  Sabine Lisicki

The following players received entry from the qualifying draw:

  Anna Chakvetadze
  Jamie Hampton
  Michaëlla Krajicek
  Tamira Paszek

The following players received entry from a Lucky loser spot:
  Zuzana Kučová
  Beatriz García Vidagany

Withdrawals
  Petra Kvitová (lower back injury) 
  Yanina Wickmayer (knee injury)

Finals

Singles

 Julia Görges defeated  Caroline Wozniacki, 7–6(7–3), 6–3
 It was Görges' 1st title of the year and 2nd of her career.

Doubles

 Sabine Lisicki /  Samantha Stosur defeated  Kristina Barrois /  Jasmin Wöhr, 6–1, 7–6(7–5)

References

External links
 Official website

Porsche Tennis Grand Prix
Porsche Tennis Grand Prix
2011 in German tennis
2010s in Baden-Württemberg
Porsch